Sugar is the second full-length album from Athens, Georgia based band, Dead Confederate. It was recorded in Hoboken, NJ with producer John Agnello (The Hold Steady, Dinosaur Jr., Sonic Youth) in early 2010.

Track listing

Personnel
Dead Confederate
 Hardy Morris – vocals, electric guitar, acoustic guitar, production
 Brantley Senn – bass, vocals, string arrangements, production
 Walker Howle – electric guitar
 John Watkins – keyboards
 Jason Scarboro – drums

Additional Musicians
 J Mascis – guitar, vocals
 Ben Wigler – vocals, vibraphone
 Heidi Vanderlee – cello

Production
 John Agnello – producer, mixing, engineer
 James Frazee – assistant engineer
 Greg Calbi – mastering
 Joel Wheat – artwork

References

External links
 Official Website – Dead Confederate

2010 albums
Dead Confederate albums
Albums produced by John Agnello